Apteropeoedes is a genus of grasshoppers. Species are found in the Indian Ocean islands.

References

External links 

 
 Apteropeoedes at insectoid.info

Caelifera genera
Euschmidtiidae
Taxa named by Ignacio Bolívar